Andrija Crnogorac (born September 23, 1981) is a former Serbian professional basketball player. He start his career in Partizan. He played in Partizan 2 years and won Yugoslav Cup in 1999.

References

1981 births
Living people
Bosnia and Herzegovina expatriate basketball people in Serbia
KK Avala Ada players
KK Partizan players
KK Sloga players
Lugano Tigers players
Power forwards (basketball)
SAV Vacallo Basket players
Serbian men's basketball players
Serbian expatriate basketball people in Slovenia
Serbian expatriate basketball people in Switzerland
Serbs of Bosnia and Herzegovina
People from Gradiška, Bosnia and Herzegovina